Da Qing Fengyun, alternatively known as Qing Gong Fengyun, is a 2006 Chinese television series directed by Chen Jialin, starring Zhang Fengyi, Xu Qing and Jiang Wen. Set in the early Qing dynasty, the story focuses on the romance between Dorgon and Empress Dowager Xiaozhuang.

Cast
 Zhang Fengyi as Dorgon
 Xu Qing as Empress Dowager Xiaozhuang
 Jiang Wen as Hong Taiji
 Sun Chun as Fan Haozheng
 Wang Huichun as Fan Haomin
 Li Guangjie as Dodo
 Lu Xingyu as Hooge
 Tao Huimin as Lady Abahai
 Yang Lishan as Ajige
 Guo Tao as Oboi
 Xu Fengnian as He Luohui
 Tang Yinuo as Fulin
 Daichi Harashima as young Fulin
 Yang Zheng as Shuoguo
 Ma Jing as Xiuxiu
 Wang Biao as Imperial Physician Jin
 Zhang Hao as Suksaha
 Xu Zhengyun as Jirgalang
 Han Xiao as Sulan
 Hou Zhengmin as Liu Guangcai
 Xu Baozhong as Sonin
 Liao Bingyan as Daišan
 Li Mei as Mrs Fan
 Wang Shujun as Zheng Dehai
 Chen Jianyue as Harjol

External links
  Da Qing Fengyun on Sina.com
  Da Qing Fengyun on xinhuanet.com

2006 Chinese television series debuts
Television series set in the Qing dynasty
Mandarin-language television shows
China Central Television original programming
Chinese historical television series